Galloway and Upper Nithsdale was a constituency of the Scottish Parliament (Holyrood). It elected one Member of the Scottish Parliament (MSP) by the plurality (first past the post) method of election. This constituency was abolished for the 2011 election, with 78.4% of the constituency being incorporated into the new Galloway and West Dumfries (Scottish Parliament constituency), with the rest becoming part of the Dumfriesshire (Scottish Parliament constituency).

Electoral region

Constituency boundaries and council area 
The Galloway and Upper Nithsdale constituency was created at the same time as the Scottish Parliament, in 1999, with the name and boundaries of an  existing Westminster constituency. In 2005, however, Scottish Westminster (House of Commons) constituencies were mostly replaced with new constituencies.

Member of the Scottish Parliament 
Alex Fergusson represented the constituency from the 2003 election until its abolition in 2011, having previously been an MSP for the South of Scotland regional list from 1999 to 2003. Originally elected as a Conservative, he was the Presiding Officer of the Scottish Parliament from 2007 to 2011, a post which required him to relinquish party allegiance.

Election results

Footnotes 

Scottish Parliament constituencies and regions 1999–2011
1999 establishments in Scotland
Constituencies established in 1999
2011 disestablishments in Scotland
Constituencies disestablished in 2011
Politics of Dumfries and Galloway
Newton Stewart
Castle Douglas
Stranraer
Kirkcudbrightshire
Wigtownshire
Whithorn
Dalbeattie